Between 1843 and 1856 the New South Wales Legislative Council was a hybrid in which some members of the Council were elected and the balance were appointed by the Governor.
A by-election was held for the when an elected member's seat became vacant through resignation, death or some other reason. In 1856 the unicameral Legislative Council was abolished and replaced with an elected Legislative Assembly and an appointed Legislative Council.

Notes

References

By-elections Legislative Council 1843-1856
New South Wales Legislative Council
By-elections Legislative Council